The Roman Catholic Diocese of Gboko is a diocese located in the city of Gboko, Benue State in the Ecclesiastical province of Abuja in Nigeria.

Territory

The Diocese of Gboko is located in a portion of Benue State.

Chronology of Bishops
 Bishop William Amove Avenya (29 December 2012 – present)

History

The diocese was established 29 December 2012 from the Roman Catholic Diocese of Makurdi.

See also
Catholic Church in Nigeria

References

Sources
Official Announcement of establishment of new diocese by Vatican News

External links
GCatholic.org information page

Roman Catholic dioceses in Nigeria
Christian organizations established in 2012
Roman Catholic dioceses and prelatures established in the 21st century
Roman Catholic Ecclesiastical Province of Abuja